Carlo Gourlaouen (27 July 1899 – September 1946) was a Swiss cross-country skier. He competed in the men's 50 kilometre event at the 1928 Winter Olympics.

References

1899 births
1946 deaths
Swiss male cross-country skiers
Olympic cross-country skiers of Switzerland
Cross-country skiers at the 1928 Winter Olympics
Place of birth missing